Mamaux Building located at 123 First Avenue in downtown Pittsburgh, Pennsylvania, was built circa 1865.  This Italianate style building was added to the List of City of Pittsburgh historic designations on July 27, 1995.

References

Buildings and structures in Pittsburgh
Italianate architecture in Pennsylvania
Buildings and structures completed in 1865